KMBX (700 AM) is a radio station broadcasting a Spanish religious format Licensed to Soledad, California, United States, the station is currently owned by Entravision Holdings, LLC.

History

KMBX started broadcasting in 1992. Its original call letters were KQKE, which on December 14, 1994, were changed to KSUR, and on February 1, 1995, became KVRG.

Expanded Band assignment

On March 17, 1997, the Federal Communications Commission (FCC) announced that eighty-eight stations had been given permission to move to newly available "Expanded Band" transmitting frequencies, ranging from 1610 to 1700 kHz, with KVRG authorized to move from 700 to 1700 kHz. However, the station never procured the Construction Permit needed to implement the authorization, so the expanded band station was never built.

The station's call sign was changed to KSES on September 9, 1999, and to KMBX on December 3, 2001.

References

External links
KMBX website

MBX
Entravision Communications stations
MBX